Palazzo Tirelli (formerly Gabbi) is a building in the historical centre of Reggio Emilia, northern Italy.

The building was built in the 17th century as the city residence for the marquises Gabbi.  In the beginning of the 19th century the palazzo was sold to the noble family Tirelli; in 1970, they sold a part of it to a club called Società del Casino, that at present still owns it.  The rotary club of Reggio also has its head office on the ground floor.

The grand staircase leads to the rooms of the first floor decorated with stucco and frescos of the local painter Prospero Zanichelli.  The biggest room, 13 metres high, is decorated with  beautiful frescos and 8 paintings that represent Homeric scenes, by Francesco Vellani from Modena.

Tirelli
Baroque architecture in Emilia-Romagna